The 1998 Rhode Island Rams football team was an American football team that represented the University of Rhode Island in the Atlantic 10 Conference during the 1998 NCAA Division I-AA football season. In their sixth season under head coach Floyd Keith, the Rams compiled a 3–8 record (2–6 against conference opponents) and finished last in the New England Division of the conference.

Schedule

References

Rhode Island
Rhode Island Rams football seasons
Rhode Island Rams football